Ion Bostan may refer to: 

 Ion Bostan (film director) (1914–1992), Romanian documentary film director
 Ion Bostan (academic) (born 1949), professor and researcher from Moldova